Roberto Wenceslao Bonomi Oliva (30 September 1919 in Buenos Aires, Argentina – 10 January 1992) was a racing driver who took part in one Formula One World Championship Grand Prix driving a Cooper for the Scuderia Centro Sud team. Before he participated in Formula One he was a sports car champion in 1952 and 1953, as well as a member of the Argentine team to race in Europe. Bonomi worked as a local politician and landowner.

Complete Formula One World Championship results
(key)

References

1919 births
1992 deaths
Racing drivers from Buenos Aires
Argentine racing drivers
Argentine Formula One drivers
World Sportscar Championship drivers
Scuderia Centro Sud Formula One drivers

Carrera Panamericana drivers